Threepoint Mountain is the descriptive name for a three-pointed  mountain summit located in the Elbow River valley of Kananaskis Country, in the Canadian Rockies of Alberta, Canada. it is situated southwest of Calgary and can be seen from Highway 66. Threepoint Mountain's nearest higher peak is Bluerock Mountain,  to the south. The mountain's name was made official in 1951 by the Geographical Names Board of Canada.

Geology

Threepoint Mountain is composed of sedimentary rock laid down during the Precambrian to Jurassic periods and was later pushed east and over the top of younger rock during the Laramide orogeny.

Climate

Based on the Köppen climate classification, Threepoint Mountain is located in a subarctic climate zone with cold, snowy winters, and mild summers. Precipitation runoff from the mountain drains into tributaries of the Elbow River.

Gallery

See also

 Mountains of Alberta
 Geography of Alberta

References

External links
 Threepoint Mountain weather forecast

Threepoint Mountain
Threepoint Mountain
Alberta's Rockies